McNeill is a Scottish and Irish surname. The name McNeill is often associated with the islands of Gigha and Colonsay. The name is considered a sub-sept of Clan MacNeill, which is historically associated with the island of Barra in the outer Hebrides. The Gaelic patronymic meaning of McNeill is 'Son of Neil'. The annals of ulster claim Lóegaire mac Néill as King of Tara or High King of Ireland.

List
Notable people with the surname include:
Alan McNeill (born 1945), Northern Irish footballer
Alex McNeill (c. 1875–?), Scottish footballer
Alexander McNeill (New Zealand politician) (1833–1915)
Alexander McNeill (1842–1932), Canadian politician
Alim McNeill (born 2000), American football player
Allen McNeill (born 1951), American politician
Allison McNeill (born 1959), Canadian basketball coach
Ann McNeill, British academic and tobacco policy expert
Anthony McNeill (1941–1996), Jamaican poet
Archibald McNeill (died 1849), American politician from North Carolina
Ben McNeill, Australian film producer
Beth McNeill (born 1982), New Zealand cricketer
Billy McNeill (1940–2019), Scottish footballer and manager
Billy McNeill (ice hockey) (1936–2007), Canadian ice hockey player
Bob McNeill (born 1938), American basketball player
Charlie McNeill (bowls) (1888–1974), Australian lawn bowls player
Chris McNeill (1954–2011), American ski jumper
Dan K. McNeill (born 1946), United States Army four-star general
Daniel McNeill (1947–2017), American politician from Pennsylvania
Daryl C. McNeill (c. 1960–2013), American football player and coach
David McNeill (disambiguation), multiple people
Don McNeill (disambiguation), multiple people, including:
Don McNeill (radio presenter) (1907–1996), American radio personality
Don McNeill (tennis) (1918–1996), American tennis player
Donald Burgess McNeill (1911–2010), physics and transport author
Dorelia McNeill (1881–1969), English artists' model
Duncan McNeill, 1st Baron Colonsay (1793–1874), Scottish judge and politician
Edwin R. McNeill (1880–1962), American attorney and judge
Fergus McNeill, Scottish writer
F. Marian McNeill (1885–1973), Scottish folklorist
Fred McNeill (1952–2015), American football linebacker
George McNeill (born 1975), American golfer
George McNeill (sprinter) (born 1947), Scottish athlete and footballer
George E. McNeill (1836–1906), American labor leader
George Monroe McNeill (1845–1931), Union Army soldier and a founder of Carterville, Illinois
Gordon James McNeill (1922–1999), Canadian politician
Graham McNeill (born c. 1971), British novelist and game developer
Grant McNeill (born 1983), Canadian ice hockey player
Hamish McNeill (1934–2017), Scottish footballer
Hector McNeill (1728–1785), officer in the Continental Navy during the American Revolutionary War
Hinematau McNeill, New Zealand academic and treaty negotiator
Ian McNeill (1932–2017), Scottish footballer and manager
James McNeill (1869–1938), Irish politician and diplomat
Jane McNeill (born 1966), American actress
Janet McNeill (1907–1994), Irish novelist and playwright
Jeanne McNeill, American politician
Jim McNeill (born 1960), British polar explorer, presenter and keynote speaker
John McNeill (disambiguation), multiple people
Josephine McNeill (1895–1969), Irish diplomat
Kenneth McNeill (1918–2001), Jamaican politician and surgeon
Kia McNeill (born 1986), American soccer player
Kim McNeill, American basketball coach
Larry McNeill (1951–2004), American basketball player
Lawrence McNeill (1849–1915), American businessman
Lee Vernon McNeill (born 1964), American track and field athlete 
Lloyd McNeill, American jazz flutist and visual artist
Louise McNeill (1911–1993), American poet, essayist and historian of Appalachia
Malcolm McNeill (born 1945), New Zealand jazz singer
Marcus McNeill (born 1983), American football offensive tackle
Mark McNeill (born 1993), Canadian ice hockey forward

Mica McNeill (born 1993), British bobsledder
Mike McNeill (born 1966), American ice hockey player
Mike McNeill (American football) (born 1988), American football tight end
Neil McNeill (1921–2009), Australian politician
Neil McNeill (footballer) (born 1932), Australian rules footballer
Niall McNeill (1899–1969), Irish army officer and entomologist
Pamela McNeill, American singer-songwriter
Patrick McNeill (born 1987), Canadian ice hockey player
Pauline McNeill (born 1962), Scottish Labour politician
Raymond J. McNeil (1932-2021), American politician, Army Veteran, World traveler and Head Harris
Reid McNeill (born 1992), Canadian ice hockey player
Robert McNeill (footballer) (1873–?), Scottish footballer for Sunderland and Greenock Morton
Robert B. McNeill (1915–1975), American Presbyterian minister
Robert Duncan McNeill (born 1964), American actor, producer and director
Robert H. McNeill (1917–2005), American photographer
Rod McNeill (born 1951), American football running back
Roger McNeill (1853–1924), Scottish physician
Ronald McNeill, 1st Baron Cushendun (1861–1934), British Conservative politician
Ruffin McNeill (born 1958), American football coach
Serayah Ranee McNeill (born 1995), American actress, model and singer
Sheila McNeill, American politician
Sophie McNeill (born 1986), Australian journalist, television presenter and human rights activist
Stu McNeill (born 1938), Canadian ice hockey player
Sylvia McNeill (born 1947), British pop and rock singer-songwriter
Tara McNeill, Irish violinist, harpist and soprano singer
Ted McNeill (1929–1979), English footballer
Tom McNeill (born 1942), American football punter
William McNeill (disambiguation), multiple people
Wykeham McNeill (born 1957), Jamaican politician

As first or middle name

Robert McNeill Alexander (1934–2016), British zoologist
Donald McNeill Fairfax (1818–1894), United States Navy admiral
Isabel McNeill Carley (1918–2011), American writer, editor and composer
Charles McNeill Gray (1807–1885), American politician
Lillian McNeill Palmer (1871–1961), American coppersmith and metalsmith
Daniel McNeill Parker (1822–1907), Canadian physician and politician
James Abbott McNeill Whistler (1834–1903), American artist
Anna McNeill Whistler (1804–1881), American art model, the mother of James Abbott McNeill Whistler
McNeill Smith (1918–2011), American politician and attorney

See also
McNeil (disambiguation)
MacNeil
MacNeill
McNeal
MacNeal
MacNeille

Scottish surnames
Clan MacNeil
Patronymic surnames
Surnames from given names